Officiating Director is Dr. Pawan Goel 
Shaheed Hasan Khan Mewati Government Medical College, is situated on the outskirts of Nuh in Nalhar in Nuh district of Haryana state in India.

Description
The college is 75 km from Delhi on National Highway 8, 47 km from Gurgaon and 57 km from Faridabad. It came into existence in 2012 through a Government of Haryana Legislative Act in 2013. The University imparts Undergraduate medical education (Bachelor of Medicine, Bachelor of Surgery). The college is accredited by the Medical Council of India.

1st Batch was admitted from 2013.
Students from Gold Field Medical college, Faridabad are also pursuing there course here and also in other medical colleges in haryana.
Current officiating director is Dr. Pawan goel 

It also has  overwhelming nature of trees and birds and very soothing environment

See also

 List of medical colleges in Haryana

References

External links
 Official website
 Old Website

Hospitals in Haryana
Medical colleges in Haryana
Universities and colleges in Haryana
Teaching hospitals in India
Nuh district
Educational institutions established in 2012
Hospitals established in 2012
2012 establishments in Haryana